Jean Louis Edmond Saint-Edme De Manne, known under the name Edmond-Denis De Manne, (18 August 1801 in Paris – 6 May 1877 in Paris) was a 19th-century French playwright and journalist.

De Manne was a member of the Société des auteurs et compositeurs dramatiques and mayor of Champ-Haut (Orne) where he is buried. In addition to his publications, he wrote numerous articles in the papers of his time. He also wrote under the pen names Armand Duplessis, Fernand de Lisle, Alexis Bartevelle, Edmond Nouel and Dupré.

Publications 

1820: Histoire d'un chien naufragé, then a pupil at royal college Henri IV
1821: Vers sur la naissance de SAR Mgr le duc de Bordeaux, signed Edmond de M.
1822: Parallèle de Talma et de Joanny
1822: La Peste de Barcelone, ou le dévouement des médecins français, written when the author was an employee at the King's library
1831: Un dimanche à Londres, ou Vive la France, comédie en vaudeville written with Tellier
1831: Le Mouchoir bleu, comédie en vaudeville written with M. Marguès
1834: Nouveau recueil d'ouvrages anonymes et pseudonymes
1835: Chansons, under the pen name Alexis Bartevelle ;
1838: Une conquête !, one-act comédie en vaudeville, under his pseudonym
1844: À Molière, hommage de la postérité…
1835: Avec Mme… : Souvenirs, poésies
1838: Une conquête, comédie en Vaudeville
1842: Emery le négociant, three-act drama
1851: Le Château de Carrouges
1851: Le Désert et ses épisodes, translated from English
1852: Voisin de campagne, comédie en vaudeville
1853: Un laquais d'autrefois, one-act comédie en vaudeville, under his pseudonym
1864: Avant souper, comedy in 1 act in prose, under his pseudonym
1861: Galerie historique des portraits des comédiens de la troupe de Voltaire
1862: Nouveau dictionnaire des ouvrages anonymes et pseudonymes
1866: Galerie historique des comédiens de la troupe de Talma
1869: Galerie historique des comédiens de la troupe de Nicolet, available on Gallica ;
1869: Esquisses historiques sur quelques localités de la Normandie
1870: Chansons
1876: Galerie historique de la Comédie Française
1877: Galerie historique des acteurs français

External links 
 Edmond-Denis De Manne on Data.bnf.fr
 Edmond-Denis De Manne on Wikisource

19th-century French dramatists and playwrights
19th-century French journalists
French male journalists
French librarians
French chansonniers
French bibliographers
Chevaliers of the Légion d'honneur
1801 births
Writers from Paris
1877 deaths
19th-century French male writers